Persicoptila haemanthes is a moth in the family Cosmopterigidae. It is found on the Solomon Islands.

References

Natural History Museum Lepidoptera generic names catalog

Cosmopteriginae
Moths described in 1935